The Louisiana Tech Bulldogs and Lady Techsters track and field team is the intercollegiate track and field program representing the Louisiana Tech University. The school competes in Conference USA in Division I of the National Collegiate Athletic Association (NCAA).

NCAA Championships

John Campbell won the NCAA Division I championship in the shot put in 1985.

Olympians

World championships

References

External links